Donald Mitchell may refer to:

Donald Mitchell (writer) (1925–2017), British writer on music
Donald Grant Mitchell (1822–1908), American essayist and novelist
Donald J. Mitchell (1923–2003), Congressman from New York
Donald Mitchell (American football) (born 1976), Tennessee Titans football player
Donald O. Mitchell, American sound engineer
Donald Mitchell (weightlifter) (1955-2010), Australian Olympic weightlifter

See also
Don Mitchell (disambiguation)